Frankie Raymond Gavin (born 28 September 1985) is a British professional boxer. He held the British and Commonwealth welterweight titles between 2012 and 2015, and has challenged once for the IBF welterweight title in 2015. As an amateur, Gavin won a gold medal in the lightweight division at the 2007 World Championships, becoming England's first ever winner of that event. He also won lightweight gold at the 2006 Commonwealth Games.

Amateur career
Domestically as an amateur, Gavin represented the Birmingham's Hall Green boxing club with whom he won the English ABA championship in 2005 and 2007 and a Four Nations championship in 2005.

Internationally, Gavin defeated Giovanni Frontin of Mauritius to win a gold at the 2006 Commonwealth Games in the lightweight (60 kg) division. That year, he won bronze at the European Union Championships losing to Domenico Valentino in the semi-final. Gavin has beaten him twice since.

At the European Championships 2006 he lost to Olexandr Klyuchko.

2007 World Championships 
At the 2007 World Championships, he first beat reigning world silver medallist and fellow southpaw Romal Amanov of Azerbaijan scoring a knockdown. Frankie then caused a huge upset by defeating Russian superstar Aleksei Tishchenko, unbeaten in four years, to reach the final where he beat Italian Domenico Valentino 19:10.

2007 AIBA World Amateur championships held in Chicago 

Defeated Omar Ward (Barbados) RSC 3 (0:50)
Defeated Ramal Amanov (Azerbaijan) 21–10
Defeated Onur Sipal (Turkey) 16–7
Defeated Alexei Tichtchenko (Russia) 19–10
Defeated Domenico Valentino (Italy) 18–10

He stepped up in weight and won the 2008 EU tournament in Poland receiving boxer of the tournament as well.
As of 2007, he has won 100 of his 121 amateur contests.

2008 Summer Olympics 
Gavin was Great Britain's best hope of a boxing medal at the 2008 Summer Olympics, but was unable to make the weight and was therefore unable to compete.

Professional career 
In October 2008, Gavin announced that he would turn professional. He signed a contract with promoter Frank Warren and agreed to be trained by Anthony Farnell in Manchester. He made his debut with Olympians James Degale and Billy Joe Saunders which he won with a 4th round stoppage.

In 2010, he won his first professional title by defeating Sheffield's Michael Kelly in the fifth round for the Irish light welterweight title. He qualified for the title as his parents are Irish.

In June 2013, Gavin defeated the previously unbeaten Denton Vassell by 7th-round TKO, having broken Vassell's jaw. In doing so he retained his BBBofC British welterweight title and captured Vassell's Commonwealth title.

Professional boxing record

References

External links 

1985 births
Living people
Boxers from Birmingham, West Midlands
English male boxers
English people of Irish descent
Commonwealth Games gold medallists for England
Boxers at the 2006 Commonwealth Games
AIBA World Boxing Championships medalists
Lightweight boxers
Light-welterweight boxers
Welterweight boxers
Commonwealth Boxing Council champions
Commonwealth Games medallists in boxing
British Boxing Board of Control champions
Medallists at the 2006 Commonwealth Games